The Karachi Stock Exchange ( or PSX-KSE) was a stock exchange located in Karachi, Pakistan. Since 1947, it has been located at the Stock Exchange Building on I. I. Chundrigar Road. It has now been consolidated in the Pakistan Stock Exchange, along with the Lahore Stock Exchange and Islamabad Stock Exchange. The KSE was Pakistan's largest and oldest stock exchange. According to Bloomberg, the Pakistani benchmark stock market index is the third-best performer in the world since 2009. In June 2015, Khaleej Times reported that since 2009, Pakistani equities delivered 26% a year for US dollar investors, making Karachi the top-performing stock exchange in the world.

History 
The Karachi Stock Exchange was established on 18 September 1947, after the arrival of the educated and affluent Muhajirs, and was incorporated as Karachi Stock Exchange Limited on 10 March 1949. For over 60 years, the KSE facilitated capital formation, serving a wide spectrum of participants, including individual and institutional investors. With a growing number of listed companies and trading activities by the late 1980s, another index was proposed. On 1 November 1991, the KSE 100 Index was introduced. By 1995, the need for a futures index was realized and on 18 September 1995, the KSE All Shares Index was introduced. To address the needs of the investors community, two other indexes were introduced in the late 1990s - the KSE-30 Index and KMI 30 Index. Work on a fully automated trading system began in the late 1990s and in 2002, the Karachi Automated Trading System or KATS was launched, which had the ability to handle over 1 million trades per day. In the same year, the KSE was declared the "Best Performing Stock Market of the World". In 2016, the Karachi Stock Exchange, Lahore Stock Exchange and Islamabad Stock Exchange were integrated under the Stock Exchanges (Corporatisation, Demutualization and Integration) Act, 2012 to form the Pakistan Stock Exchange.

Hours 
The exchange has a trading session from 09:32am to 03:30pm PST and a post-market session from 03:31pm to 04:00pm PST from Monday to Thursday. On Friday, the trading session is split with the trading session beginning from 09:17am to 12:00pm and 02:32pm to 04:30pm. The exchange is closed on Saturdays and Sundays and holidays are declared by the exchange in advance.

Companies listed

See also 
 KSE 100 Index
 KSE 30 Index
 Lahore Stock Exchange
 Islamabad Stock Exchange
 Economy of Pakistan
 Economy of Karachi
 E-trading in Pakistan
 List of Pakistani companies
 List of stock exchanges

References

External links 

Former stock exchanges in Pakistan
Buildings and structures in Karachi
1947 establishments in Pakistan
Pakistan Stock Exchange
Pakistani companies established in 1947